Alexey Sergeyevich Dreev (also transliterated as Aleksey or Alexei; born 30 January 1969) is a Russian chess player. He was awarded the title Grandmaster by FIDE in 1989.

Career
While being a promising young chess talent, he was for a period coached by the world-class chess trainer Mark Dvoretsky.

Dreev was world under 16 champion in 1983 and 1984, and the European junior champion in 1988.  In 1989 he became a grandmaster, won a strong tournament at Moscow (+5 =5 −1) and made his first appearance in the Russian Chess Championship.

In the 1990–1993 world championship cycle he qualified for the Candidates Tournament at Manila 1990 Interzonal, but lost his 1991 round of sixteen match to Viswanathan Anand in Madras (+1 =5 −4).
Then in the FIDE World Championship Tournaments, firstly at Groningen 1997, he reached the quarter finals where he lost to Boris Gelfand. In the next four FIDE World Championship tournaments he was knocked out at the last sixteen stage: at Las Vegas 1999 by Michael Adams, at New Delhi 2000 to Veselin Topalov, at Moscow 2001 to Viswanathan Anand, and finally at Tripoli 2004 to Leinier Domínguez.

During the 1990s, his best international tournament victories included the Biel Grandmaster Tournament (+5 =8 −0) and the Hoogovens tournament (+9 =4 −1), both in 1995; in the latter, Dreev beat Evgeny Bareev by 2.5-1.5 in the final. He also won at Reggio Emilia in 1995/96.

In 2000 Dreev won the 1st European Blitz Chess Championship in Neum on tiebreak over Ivan Sokolov.

He played in the prestigious 2002 match Russia versus Rest of the World and contributed a plus score, although the Russian team went on to lose the match. He was the winner at Dos Hermanas 2001 and at Esbjerg 2003.

Dreev's best performance in the Russian Championship was in 2004 at Moscow when he finished third (+4 =5 −2). This tournament was won by Garry Kasparov.

In 2007 he won the 5th Parsvnath Open in New Delhi. Dreev won the Magistral Casino de Barcelona round-robin tournament in 2008. In 2011 he won the Cento Open on tiebreak score.

Dreev won the European Rapid Chess Championship of 2012 in Warsaw.

In May 2013 he tied for 1st–8th with Alexander Moiseenko, Evgeny Romanov, Alexander G Beliavsky, Constantin Lupulescu, Francisco Vallejo Pons, Sergei Movsesian, Ian Nepomniachtchi, Hrant Melkumyan and Evgeny Alekseev in the European Individual Chess Championship. He competed in the Chess World Cup 2013 in Tromsø, where he reached the third round and was eliminated by the eventual runner-up, Dmitry Andreikin. Dreev knocked out Sergei Azarov and Wang Hao in rounds one and two respectively.

In October of the same year, Dreev won the 3rd Indonesia Open Chess Championship in Jakarta.

In January 2016, Dreev tied with Baskaran Adhiban and Eltaj Safarli for first place in the Tata Steel Challengers Tournament in Wijk aan Zee. However, because of his better tiebreak, Adhiban qualified for the following Tata Steel Masters Tournament. In 2018 Dreev won the Fall Chess Classic A tournament in St. Louis, US with a score of 6½/9, one point ahead of the nearest follower, Lázaro Bruzón.

He has represented Russia in five Chess Olympiads between 1992 and 2004, with the Russian team winning gold medals in 1992, 1994, and 1996, and silver in 2004. His combined score from those events is +15 =23 −6 (60.2%).

Books

Notable games 
 Alexey Dreev-Gata Kamsky Kazakhstan 1987 Ponziani opening 1-0 56 moves.
 Alexey Dreev-Viswanathan Anand Candidates match game 3 1991 Queen's Indian defence 1-0 46 moves.
 Loek van Wely-Alexey Dreev World cup 2005 Semi-Slav defence 0-1 91 moves.
 Alexander Morozevich-Alexey Dreev Russian Superfinals 2007 Sicilian defence 0-1 49 moves.
 Sam A Schmakel-Alexey Dreev Millionaire Chess 2014 Slav defence modern line 0-1 39 moves.

References

External links

 
 
 
 

1969 births
Living people
Chess grandmasters
Chess Olympiad competitors
World Youth Chess Champions
Russian chess players
Soviet chess players
Russian chess writers
People from Stavropol